AMD APP SDK is a software development kit by AMD for "Accelerated Parallel Processing" (APP). AMD APP SDK also targets Heterogeneous System Architecture (not only GPU).

AMD APP SDK was available for 32-bit and 64-bit versions of Microsoft Windows and Linux but was removed from AMD's official website. A developer stated in a forum post that the SDK was discontinued as the required libraries are now included with the drivers.

AMD intends developers to employ AMD APP SDK to utilize Video Coding Engine hybrid mode to create hybrid encoders that pair custom motion estimation, inverse discrete cosine transform and motion compensation with the hardware entropy encoding to achieve faster than real-time encoding.

The AMD APP SDK v3.0 supports OpenCL 2.0 and Catalyst Omega 15.7 driver, also it includes samples for OpenCL as well as accelerated libraries such as Bolt (an open-source C++ template library) and the OpenCL accelerated OpenCV (Open Computer Vision) library. This last version can be downloaded with the aid of StackOverflow.

History 
AMD APP SDK replaced AMD Stream SDK (formerly named ATI Stream SDK). AMD CAL (Compute Abstraction Layer) SDK was replaced by ATI Stream SDK, available for Microsoft Windows and Linux, 32-bit and 64-bit. As of February 2021, there are few signs on the AMD official web site that AMD APP SDK ever existed.

References

External links 
 Unofficial Windows mirror
 Unofficial Linux mirror
 ROCm - Radeon Open Compute, designed to be a successor to the AMD APP SDK

AMD software
GPGPU libraries
Heterogeneous System Architecture